Kalleh Garmak (also known as Kalleh Garmak-e Bālā) is a village in Kahnuk Rural District, Irandegan District, Khash County, Sistan and Baluchestan Province, Iran. At the 2006 census, its population was 46, in 14 families.

References 

Populated places in Khash County